Regent "Roger" Côté (December 22, 1939 – July 16, 2020) was a Canadian professional ice hockey defenceman who played 155 games in the World Hockey Association for the Edmonton Oilers and Indianapolis Racers. Over a 19 year career, Côté played the majority of his seasons with teams in the semi-professional (QHL) or minor professional leagues (AHL, WHL, EPHL, SHL).

He died on 16 July 2020.

References

External links

1939 births
2020 deaths
Canadian ice hockey defencemen
Edmonton Oilers (WHA) players
French Quebecers
Ice hockey people from Quebec
Indianapolis Racers players
People from Abitibi-Témiscamingue
Winston-Salem Polar Twins (SHL) players